Ronald Eugene "Trey" Ball III (born June 27, 1994) is an American former professional baseball pitcher. The Boston Red Sox selected him in the first round of the 2013 Major League Baseball draft.

Career
Ball graduated from New Castle High School in New Castle, Indiana, where he played for the school's baseball team as a pitcher and outfielder. In his senior year, Ball led his team to the North Central Conference championship and won the Gatorade Indiana Baseball Player of the Year Award. Ball committed to attend the University of Texas at Austin, where he would play college baseball for the Texas Longhorns baseball team.

The Boston Red Sox selected Ball in the first round, with the seventh overall selection, in the 2013 MLB draft. He signed with the Red Sox, receiving a $2.75 million signing bonus, and spent 2013 with the Gulf Coast Red Sox of the rookie-level Gulf Coast League, where he had an 0–1 win–loss record with a 6.43 ERA in seven innings pitched. In 2014, he played for the Greenville Drive of the Class A South Atlantic League where he pitched to a 5–10 record and 4.68 ERA in 22 starts, and in 2015, he pitched for the Salem Red Sox of the Class A-Advanced Carolina League, where he compiled a 9–13 record, 4.73 ERA, and 1.46 WHIP in 25 starts. Ball spent 2016 back with Salem where he was 8–6 with a 3.84 ERA in 23 games started and 2017 with the Portland Sea Dogs of the Class AA Eastern League, where he collected a 7–12 record and 5.27 ERA in 25 games (24 starts).

In 2018, Ball returned to Portland as a relief pitcher. He continued to struggle, pitching to a 7.58 ERA in  innings. In 2019, Ball planned to become a two-way player, as both a pitcher and an outfielder. During the season, he appeared in five Gulf Coast League games, batting 2-for-14 (.143); he did not pitch in any games. He became a free agent in November 2019, when his contract with the Red Sox expired.

Personal life
Ball is a cousin of Bryant McIntosh.

References

External links
 
SoxProspects.com

1994 births
Living people
Baseball pitchers
Baseball outfielders
Baseball players from Indiana
Greenville Drive players
Gulf Coast Red Sox players
New Castle Chrysler High School alumni
People from New Castle, Indiana
Salem Red Sox players
Surprise Saguaros players
Portland Sea Dogs players